Repentance ( translit. Monanieba) is a 1984 Georgian Soviet art film directed by Tengiz Abuladze.  The film was produced in 1984, however, it was banned from release in the Soviet Union for its semi-allegorical critique of Stalinism. It premiered at the 1987 Cannes Film Festival, winning the FIPRESCI Prize, Grand Prize of the Jury, and the Prize of the Ecumenical Jury. The film was selected as the Soviet entry for the Best Foreign Language Film at the 60th Academy Awards, but was not accepted as a nominee. In July 2021, the film was shown in the Cannes Classics section at the 2021 Cannes Film Festival.

Plot
Repentance is set in a small Georgian town. The film starts with the scene of a woman preparing cakes. A man in a chair is reading from a newspaper that the town's mayor, Varlam Aravidze (Avtandil Makharadze) has died. One day after the funeral the corpse of the mayor turns up in the garden of his son's house. The corpse is reburied, only to reappear again in the garden. A woman, Ketevan Barateli (Zeinab Botsvadze), is eventually arrested and accused of digging up the corpse. She defends herself and states that Varlam does not deserve to be buried as he was responsible for a Stalin-like regime of terror responsible for the disappearance of her parents and her friends. She is put on trial and gives her testimony, with the story of Varlam's regime being told in flashbacks.

During the trial, Varlam's son Abel (Avtandil Makharadze) denies any wrongdoings by his father and his lawyer tries to get Ketevan declared insane. Varlam's grandson Tornike (Merab Ninidze) is shocked by the revelations about the crimes of his grandfather. He ultimately commits suicide. Abel himself then throws Varlam's corpse off a cliff on the outskirts of the town.

At the end, the film returns to the scene of the woman preparing a cake. An old woman is asking her at the window whether this is the road that leads to the church. The woman replies that the road is Varlam Street and will not lead to the temple. The old woman replies: "What good is a road if it doesn't lead to a church?"

Cast
Abuladze cast several of his family members in leading roles in the film.

 Avtandil Makharadze as Varlam Aravidze and as middle-aged Abel Aravidze
 Dato Kemkhadze as young Abel Aravidze, son of Varlam Aravidze
 Ia Ninidze as Guliko, Abel's wife
 Zeinab Botsvadze as Ketevan Barateli
 Ketevan Abuladze as Nino Barateli
 Edisher Giorgobiani as Sandro Barateli
 Kakhi Kavsadze as Mikheil Koresheli
 Merab Ninidze as Tornike, Abel's and Guliko's son
 Nino Zaqariadze as Elene Korisheli
 Nano Ochigava as Ketevan as a child
 Boris Tsipuria
 Akaki Khidasheli
 Leo Antadze as Levan Antadze
 Rezo Esadze
 Mzia Makhviladze as M. Makhazadze
 Amiran Amiranashvili

Music
Khachaturian, Sabre Dance: at the end of the audience that Varlam Aravidze grants to Sandro Barateli, who complains to him that the scientific equipment housed by the regime in the old church threatens to destroy it. The audience takes place in what appears to be a hothouse, and the music blares from speakers hidden among the foliage.
 Debussy, Des pas sur la neige: Sandro Barateli plays Des pas sur la neige on the piano in his apartment before dawn on the morning of his arrest while Nino sleeps in a chair. The music accompanies Nino's dream of her and her husband fleeing through flooded underground passages and then through the streets of old Tbilisi, pursued by Varlam Aravidze, who rides in the back of an open-topped motorcar.
 Beethoven, Ode to Joy: Mikhail's wife Yelena sings the Ode to Joy while she appears to be delusional, talking to Nino of serving a great cause in building a grand society. "Ode to Joy" then starts playing as Sandro seems to be walking towards his execution and is hung from the church's rafters in chains, symbolically dressed like Jesus Christ.
 Beethoven, Moonlight Sonata: Abel Aravidze plays the Moonlight Sonata on the piano in his villa just before the confrontation with his son, Tornike, who then decides to commit suicide. 
 Boney M., Sunny: just before Tornike Aravidze shoots himself with the hunting rifle he received as a present from his grandfather Varlam, some friends of Abel and Guliko Aravidze enter, carrying bottles of champagne, to celebrate the victory in court over Ketevan Barateli, and a radio blaring the song Sunny.
 Gounod, Mors et Vita: the heavenly chorale from the Mors et Vita oratorio provides the background music to the close of the film, as the little old lady, played by great Georgian actress Veriko Anjaparidze, climbs the hill, up Varlam Aravidze Street, having asked directions from Ketevan Barateli to the church that was blown up by Varlam's regime.

Production
Tengiz Abuladze started to think about the film in the early 1970s. A near-fatal car accident in the early 1980s then convinced Abuladze to start shooting the film. He was encouraged by Eduard Shevardnadze who at that time was the first secretary of the Georgian Communist Party and who offered a special and uncensored slot on Georgian television for the film. During the shooting of the film the actor Gega Kobakhidze was arrested for being involved in the hijacking of Aeroflot Flight 6833. Production was temporarily halted, and was resumed several months later with Merab Ninidze replacing Kobakhidze.

Release
When the film was finished in 1984 it was screened once and then shelved for three years. In 1987, with the new political climate initiated by Mikhail Gorbachev, the film was released again all over the Soviet Union and at film festivals in Western countries. Abuladze was awarded the Order of Lenin and he accompanied Gorbachev on his first official visit to New York in 1988. In 1988, Soviet authorities again, unofficially, banned the movie for its outstanding controversy.

Reception
In West Germany, Repentance was broadcast by ZDF on 13 October 1987. The broadcast was received and widely seen in East Germany where the film was banned. East German television viewers reacted strongly as they saw parallels to their own regime. This reaction forced East German authorities and the East German press to react. Harald Wessel, second editor in chief of Neues Deutschland and the editor in chief of the Junge Welt, Hans-Dieter Schütt published editorials in their newspapers that tried to both denounce the film and to avoid anti-Soviet undertones. The situation was complicated by the fact that the editorials were for a film that was banned and should theoretically be unknown to East German readers.

Awards

See also
 List of submissions to the 60th Academy Awards for Best Foreign Language Film
 List of Soviet submissions for the Academy Award for Best Foreign Language Film

References

Bibliography
 Denise Jeanne Youngblood and Josephine Woll (2001), Repentance. I.B.Tauris, .

External links

1984 films
1984 comedy films
Soviet comedy films
Georgian-language films
Kartuli Pilmi films
Comedy films from Georgia (country)
Films directed by Tengiz Abuladze
Soviet-era films from Georgia (country)
Censored films
Magic realism films
Body snatching
Films critical of communism
1987 comedy films
1987 films
Cannes Grand Prix winners